Locoweed (also loco-weed, loco weed, and capitalizations and plurals thereof) may refer to:

Plants
Species in the genera Astragalus and Oxytropis, collectively
Species in the genera Astragalus and Oxytropis, that cause locoism (locoweed disease) in livestock
Species with "locoweed" (etc.) in a common name, including:
Astragalus alpinus, mountain locoweed
Astragalus austiniae, ball-flowered locoweed
Astragalus canadensis, Canada locoweed
Astragalus coccineus, scarlet locoweed
Astragalus didymocarpus, white dwarf locoweed
Astragalus gambelianus, dwarf locoweed
Astragalus holmgreniorum, Holmgren locoweed
Astragalus lentiginosus, mottled locoweed, speckled locoweed, spotted locoweed
Astragalus mollissimus, woolly locoweed, stemmed locoweed
Astragalus oxyphysus, Diablo locoweed
Astragalus pomonensis, Pomona locoweed
Astragalus purshii, woolly-pod locoweed
Astragalus speirocarpus, coilpod locoweed
Astragalus trichopodus, coast locoweed, Southern California locoweed
Astragalus whitneyii, Whitney's locoweed

Cannabis, loco weed, when used as a recreational drug

Datura stramonium, loco weed, when used as a hallucinogen

Oxytropis arctica, arctic locoweed
Oxytropis besseyi, Bessey's locoweed
Oxytropis borealis, boreal locoweed
Oxytropis campestris, Fassett's locoweed, field locoweed, northern yellow locoweed
Oxytropis deflexa, nodding locoweed, pendant-pod locoweed
Oxytropis huddelsonii, Huddelson's locoweed
Oxytropis jordalii, Jordal's locoweed
Oxytropis kobukensis, Kobuk locoweed
Oxytropis kokrinensis, Kokrines locoweed
Oxytropis lagopus, hare-foot locoweed
Oxytropis lambertii, Colorado locoweed, Lambert locoweed, locoweed, purple locoweed, stemless locoweed, woolly locoweed
Oxytropis maydelliana, Maydell's locoweed
Oxytropis mertensiana, Mertens' locoweed
Oxytropis monticola, late yellow locoweed, yellow-flower locoweed
Oxytropis multiceps, southwestern locoweed
Oxytropis nana, Wyoming locoweed
Oxytropis nigrescens, black(ish) locoweed
Oxytropis oreophila, mountain locoweed
Oxytropis parryi, Parry's locoweed
Oxytropis podocarpa, stalked-pod locoweed
Oxytropis riparia, Ruby Valley locoweed
Oxytropis scammaniana, Scamman's locoweed
Oxytropis sericea, early yellow locoweed, locoweed, Rocky Mountain locoweed, silky locoweed, white locoweed, white point locoweed
Oxytropis splendens, showy locoweed, whorled locoweed
Oxytropis viscida, sticky locoweed

Music
Loco Weed, Mel Tillis song